The 1990 Liberal Party of Canada leadership election was held on 23 June 1990 in Calgary, Alberta.  The party chose former Deputy Prime Minister Jean Chrétien as its new leader, replacing the outgoing leader, former Prime Minister John Turner.

Candidates

Sheila Copps, 37, Member of Parliament for Hamilton East since 1984 and was the Opposition Critic for the Environment and Social Policy. She had been a Member of Provincial Parliament in Ontario from 1981 to 1984 before entering federal politics and had run for the leadership of the Ontario Liberal Party, placing second.
Jean Chrétien, 56, had placed second to Turner at the 1984 Liberal leadership convention. He had been MP for Saint-Maurice, Quebec from 1963 until 1986 and had served as a junior cabinet minister under Lester Pearson and had several senior portfolios under Pierre Trudeau including Industry Minister, Finance Minister, Energy Minister, and Justice Minister and was the minister responsible for constitutional negotiations from 1980 to 1982 when the Constitution of Canada was patriated and the Canadian Charter of Rights and Freedoms negotiated and ratified. He served as Minister of External Affairs and Deputy Prime Minister under Turner's short-lived government.

Supporters in caucus:  Jack Anawak, Mark Assad, George Baker, Réginald Bélair, David Berger, Charles Caccia, Coline Campbell, Rex Crawford, Keith Davey (Senator), David Dingwall, Maurice Dionne, Ronald Duhamel, Sheila Finestone, Maurice Foster, Beryl Gaffney, Alfonso Gagliano, Mac Harb, Bob Kaplan, Jim Karygiannis, Leo Kolber (Senator), Derek Lee, Lawrence MacAulay, Roy MacLaren, Shirley Maheu, Sergio Marchi, Peter Milliken, Dennis Mills, Rey Pagtakhan, Gilbert Parent, George Proud, Pietro Rizzuto (Senator), Fernand Robichaud, Bill Rompkey, Roger Simmons, Brian Tobin, Lyle Vanclief, Bob Wood

Paul Martin, 51, MP for LaSalle—Émard, Quebec since 1988 and was the Opposition Critic for Treasury Board, Housing, and Urban Affairs; former president and CEO of Canada Steamship Lines.

Supporters in caucus:  Maurizio Bevilacqua, Jesse Flis, Albina Guarnieri, Jean Lapierre, Jim Peterson, Gilles Rocheleau, Joe Volpe

John Nunziata, 35, MP for York South—Weston, Toronto, since 1984, and was Opposition Critic for the Solicitor General.

Supporters in caucus:  John Nunziata

Tom Wappel, 40, MP for Scarborough West since 1988, was the Associate Opposition Critic for Immigration. An anti-abortion campaigner, he was supported by the Campaign Life Coalition.

Supporters in caucus:  Tom Wappel

(Sources used:  "30 MPs endorse Chrétien", Toronto Star, 24 January 1990; Shelley Page, "Liberal MPs jockey for favor with new boss over leadership", Toronto Star, 22 May 1990; Geoff Pounsett, "Missing Meech deadline won't kill Canada: Chrétien", Kingston Whig-Standard, 28 May 1990, p. 2; Ross Howard, "Liberal candidates fight over Meech Chrétien scolded by Martin, Copps ", Globe and Mail, 21 June 1990, A1; David Vienneau, "Martin says he'll run again", Toronto Star, 25 June 1990.)

Withdrew

Clifford Lincoln, 61, had been Quebec Minister of the Environment in the provincial Liberal government of Robert Bourassa until resigning due to a dispute over language policy. He announced his candidacy for the federal Liberal leadership but withdrew after he was defeated in his attempt to win a seat in the House of Commons in the February 12, 1990 Chambly by-election.

Declined to run

Herb Gray, 59, MP for Windsor West since 1968. He ultimately decided against running, but served as the party's parliamentary leader from February until December 1990, when Chrétien won the Beauséjour by-election and returned to parliament.

Results

Notes and references

External links
A very bitter defeat, CBC Video

1990
1990 elections in Canada
Liberal Party of Canada leadership election